The Canadian men's national field hockey team represents Canada in international men's field hockey since 1964, when it played in the 1964 Summer Olympics in Tokyo, Japan.

Tournament history

Summer Olympics

World Cup

Pan American Games

Pan American Cup

Commonwealth Games

Hockey Nations Cup

Sultan Azlan Shah Cup

Defunct competitions

Hockey World League

Champions Challenge I

Team

Current squad
The following 18 players were named on 4 November 2022 for the 2022 FIH Hockey Nations Cup in Potchefstroom, South Africa from 28 November to 4 December 2022.

Caps updated as of 4 December 2022, after the match against Pakistan.

Recent call-ups
The following players have been called up for the team in the last 12 months.

Famous players
Patrick Burrows
David Bissett
Alan Brahmst
Pat Caruso
Paul Chohan
Ken Goodwin
Christopher Ingvaldson
Ravi Kahlon
Ken Pereira
Reg Plummer
Trevor Porritt
Ross Rutledge
Nick Sandhu
Lee Wright

See also

Canada women's national field hockey team
Field hockey in Canada

References

External links

FIH profile

Field hockey
Americas men's national field hockey teams
National team